Tourrettia is a monotypic genus of flowering plants belonging to the family Bignoniaceae. It only contains one known species, Tourrettia lappacea (L'Hér.) Willd.
The genus of Tourrettia has 2 known synonyms, Dombeya  and Medica 
It is also in Tribe Tourrettieae.

Its native range stretches from Mexico down to north-western Argentina. It is found in Bolivia, Colombia, Costa Rica, Ecuador, Guatemala, Honduras, Nicaragua, Panamá, Peru and Venezuela. 

The genus name of Tourrettia is in honour of Marc Antoine Louis Claret de La Tourrette (1729–1793), a French botanist. The Latin specific epithet of lappacea is derived from lappa meaning with burrs.
It was first described and published in Mém. Acad. Sci. (Paris) 1784 on page 205 in 1787. The species was published in Sp. Pl. edition 4  Vol.3 on page 263 in 1800.

References

Bignoniaceae
Bignoniaceae genera
Plants described in 1787
Flora of Southeastern Mexico
Flora of Central America
Flora of Venezuela
Flora of western South America
Flora of Northwest Argentina